Bless This Mess  is an American single-camera sitcom created by Lake Bell and Elizabeth Meriwether for ABC. Intended as a series for Fox after it had ordered a pilot, the half-hour program was picked up by ABC, and added to its 2018–19 Tuesday night lineup, debuting on April 16, 2019. It stars Dax Shepard, Bell, JT Neal, Pam Grier, and Ed Begley Jr. In May 2019, ABC renewed the series for a second season which premiered on September 24, 2019. In May 2020, the series was canceled after two seasons.

Premise
Young couple Mike and Rio leave their home in New York and move to a farm in Bucksnort, Nebraska, that Mike inherited from his great-aunt. They find it badly neglected and occupied by a senile old man named Rudy Longfellow. Deciding to stay, they restore and try to run the farm and find themselves adapting to the strange, tightly knit community of colorful eccentrics with mixed results.

Cast

Main

Dax Shepard as Michael "Mike" Levine-Young, a former music journalist from New York. He is married to Rio.
Lake Bell as Rio Levine-Young, a former therapist and Mike's wife
 JT Neal as Jacob Bowman, Mike and Rio's neighbors' son
Pam Grier as Constance Terry, the owner of the store, "Connie's", and the local sheriff
Ed Begley Jr. as Rudy Longfellow, who lives in the Levine-Youngs' barn
David Koechner as Beau Bowman (season 2, recurring season 1), a local rancher who tries to buy the Levine-Youngs' farm but later befriends them. He is Kay's husband and Jacob's father.
Lennon Parham as Kay Bowman (season 2, recurring season 1), neighbor of Rio and Mike. She is Jacob's mother and Beau's wife.
Langston Kerman as Brandon Terry (season 2), Constance's son

Recurring

Susie Essman as Donna Levine, Rio's mother
Jim O'Heir as Kent, the town veterinarian
Nancy Lenehan as Deb, Kent's wife and a postal carrier
Lisa Linke as Clara, Rio's socially awkward friend
Belle Adams as Janine, Jacob's intensely rebellious girlfriend
Geoffrey Owens as Pastor Paul

Guest
Marla Gibbs as Belle, Constance's elderly and demanding mother
Jessica St. Clair as Stacey Grisham, Kay's sister
Edward James Olmos as Randy, Theresa's new husband
Rita Moreno as Theresa, Rudy's ex-wife
Nicole Richie as Sierra, Rio's wealthy socialite friend from New York
Martin Mull as Martin Young, Mike's father
Christine Estabrook as Maryanne Young, Mike's mother
Ryan Hansen as Matt Young, Mike's brother

Episodes

Series overview

Season 1 (2019)

Season 2 (2019–20)

Production

Development
On October 10, 2017, it was announced that Fox had given Bless This Mess for the put pilot commitment. Fox officially ordered the series to pilot in February 2018. The pilot was written by Lake Bell and Elizabeth Meriwether, who executive produced alongside Erin O'Malley, Jake Kasdan, Melvin Mar and Katherine Pope. Production companies involved with the pilot included Elizabeth Meriwether Pictures, Lake Bell Prod. and 20th Century Fox Television. After the pilot was completed, Fox declined to pick up the project; however, ABC ordered it to series on December 11, 2018. A day after that, it was announced that the series would premiere in the mid-season of 2019 and air on Tuesdays at 9:30 P.M. The series debuted on April 16, 2019.

On May 10, 2019, ABC renewed the series for a second season and premiered on September 24, 2019. On November 7, 2019, the series for a second season received a back order of six episodes. On May 21, 2020, ABC canceled the series after two seasons.

Casting
In March 2018, it was announced that Dax Shepard and Ed Begley Jr. had been cast in the pilot's lead roles. Alongside the pilot's order announcement, in June 2019 it was reported that Pam Grier, JT Neal, and Christina Offley had joined the cast. On September 16, 2019, it was announced that David Koechner, Lennon Parham, and Langston Kerman are promoted to series regular, starting with the second season.

Reception

Critical response
On review aggregator Rotten Tomatoes, the series holds an approval rating of 82% based on 11 reviews, with an average rating of 6/10. The website's critical consensus reads, "Well-written and endearingly down-home, Bless This Mess greatest gift is the joy of seeing its hilarious and like-able ensemble all in one place." On Metacritic, it has a weighted average score of 60 out of 100, based on 10 critics, indicating "mixed or average reviews".

Ratings

Season 1

Season 2

See also

Green Acres

References

External links

2010s American single-camera sitcoms
2019 American television series debuts
2020s American single-camera sitcoms
2020 American television series endings
American Broadcasting Company original programming
English-language television shows
Television series by 20th Century Fox Television
Television series by ABC Studios
Television shows set in Nebraska